is a passenger railway station on the Minato Line in the city of Hitachinaka, Ibaraki, Japan, operated by the third-sector railway operator Hitachinaka Seaside Railway.

Lines

Station layout
The station is staffed and consists of a one side platform and one island platform, serving three tracks. It is the only station on the line which is fully staffed. The line's maintenance depot adjoins the station.

History
Nakaminato Station opened on 25 December 1913 as a station on the Minato Railway.

Passenger statistics
In fiscal 2011, the station was used by an average of 492 passengers daily.

Surrounding area
center of former Nakaminato city
Nakaminato Post Office
Nakagawa River
Nakaminato fishing port

Bus routes
Ibaraki Kotsu
For Oarai Station and Mito Station

See also
 List of railway stations in Japan

References

External links

 Hitachinaka Seaside Railway station information 

Railway stations in Ibaraki Prefecture
Railway stations in Japan opened in 1913
Hitachinaka, Ibaraki